The Iowa State Fair is an annual state fair held in Des Moines, Iowa in August.

It began in 1854 and has been held on the Iowa State Fairgrounds since 1886. It is based in the state capital  Des Moines, Iowa over an 11 day period in August. With over a million visitors, it is one of the largest and best known state fairs in the United States.

History

The first Iowa State Fair was staged in Fairfield on October 25–27, 1854, with a budget of $323. The Fair was held again in Fairfield in 1855, then for the next several years, moved from town to town, remaining mostly in eastern Iowa. The Fair was held in Muscatine in 1856–1857, Oskaloosa in 1858–1859, Iowa City in 1860–1861, Dubuque in 1862–1863, Burlington in 1864–1866, Clinton in 1867–1868, Keokuk in 1869–1870 and 1874–1875, and Cedar Rapids in 1871–1873 and 1876–1878.

The Fair moved permanently within the Des Moines city limits in 1878. After the Iowa State Legislature and the City of Des Moines appropriated funds for the Fair in 1886, it moved to its current location at East 30th and East Grand in Des Moines.

The Fair was not held in 1898, due to the celebration of the World's Fair in nearby Omaha, Nebraska, as well as the Spanish–American War, 1942–1945 due to World War II, when the state allowed military personnel to use the grounds as a supply depot. In 2020 it was "postponed" due to the COVID-19 pandemic, however on August 13–23, 2020 a virtual fair was held in its place. The Fair returned in 2021.

The Fair was the setting for the 1933 film State Fair and its 1945 musical adaptation.

Fairgrounds

Located at East 30th Street and East University Avenue, it is a 10 minute drive east from downtown Des Moines. 

The fairgrounds are filled with carnival rides and vendors during the Fair.

Contests and competitions

Agricultural contests
Agricultural contests are held for the largest boar, ram, bull, and rabbit. There are 4-H, Future Farmers of America (FFA), and open-class shows for sheep, swine, beef and dairy cattle, horses, goats, llamas, rabbits, poultry and dogs. Contests include rooster crowing, hog calling, wood chopping, pie eating, monster arm wrestling, outhouse racing and cow chip throwing.

The Butter Cow

The Butter Cow, an Iowa State Fair staple since 1911 when J.K. Daniels sculpted the first one, is located in the Agricultural Building. After sculpting her first butter cow in 1960, Norma "Duffy" Lyon sculpted all six breeds of dairy cows over the next 45 years, as well as Garth Brooks, a butter version of Grant Wood's American Gothic, the Peanuts characters, Iowa native John Wayne, Elvis Presley, a Harley-Davidson motorcycle, various animals and a butter rendition of Leonardo da Vinci's The Last Supper. Lyon was succeeded in 2006 by her longtime apprentice, Sarah Pratt. Pratt's 2022 butter sculpture featured Meredith Willson's "The Music Man."

Other contests
In the past, the Iowa State Fair hosted a "healthiest baby" contest for more than 40 years. While the stated goal of the contest was to dispense advice for healthy family living, some believe that it was also an outlet for the promotion of eugenics. The contest ran from 1911 to at least the 1950s.

Food
The Iowa State Fair has a variety of food, including healthy and gluten-free offerings, from more than 200 food stands. The fair is known for its food on a stick, which numbered over 70 offerings in 2015. Some of the most distinctive are deep fried, including Snickers, Oreos, fried Cokes, cheesecake, pickle dawg (pastrami or ham with cream cheese and pickle), and butter, a popular addition when it was introduced in 2011. Other meat-on-a stick products include pork chop, the most endemic food at the fair, given the state's status as the country's top hog producer, and a bacon-wrapped hot dog dipped in a cornmeal batter. The footlong corndog is a classic Iowa State Fair food item.

Food Competitions 
Food has also been part of the friendly competition at the Iowa State Fair. Gathered in the Elwell Family Food Center are the best cooks and bakers Iowa has to offer. From pies to cinnamon rolls, the fair sees many delicious creations every year.

Entertainment

Grandstand 
The Iowa State Fair Grandstand was built in 1909 and was renovated to add more and improved seating in 1927, 1997 and then again in 2018. It is located on Grand Ave, just off of the main gate.

The Bill Riley Talent Search
Bill Riley's Iowa State Fair Talent Search debuted in 1959 and features Iowans ages 2 to 21. In 1996, Riley retired after 50 Fairs and 37 Fair Talent Shows and the Plaza Stage was renamed the Anne and Bill Riley Stage. He died in December 2006, succeeded by Bill Riley Jr., who has been host since 1997. Nearly 100 local qualifying shows are held across the state. There are seven days of preliminary competition for Sprouts (ages 2–12) and Seniors (ages 13–21), followed by the semi-finals and, ultimately, the selection of a Sprout and Senior champion.

Former Entertainment
The Iowa State Fair has been home to many forms of entertainment over the years. Notably, in 1932 the Fair hired Joseph Connolly to crash two outdated locomotives together in front of the Grandstand. Connolly named one "Hoover" and one "Roosevelt" in honor of the presidential candidates of the day, presaging the State Fair's role in Presidential nominations.  The trains accelerated to approximately 50 miles per hour and smashed in a fiery spectacle before 45,000 fairgoers.

Other past entertainment includes a plane intentionally crashing into a model of a house, a circus elephant, and a human cannonball.

Iowa State Fair Parade
The Iowa State Fair Parade is considered Iowa's largest parade. It occurs the night before the opening of the State Fair. The parade begins at the Iowa State Capitol Complex and marches west on Grand to 15th Street.

Political Soapbox
Dwight D. Eisenhower was the first president to visit the Iowa State Fair in 1954. Since then, presidential candidates have visited the Fair, and the Des Moines Register currently sponsors the "Political Soapbox,” which provides space for candidates to speak to the public. Candidates have 20 minutes to speak and can take questions from the crowd as well.  Historically the Iowa caucuses have been the first contest in the presidential nomination process, and the fair preceding the caucuses is a high visibility event for candidates.

Police Department
The Iowa State Fair Police Department was established in 2018, replacing the combination of private security guards and local law enforcement agencies that previously provided security and policing services to the Fairgrounds. Officers wear a blue uniform with a distinctive white cowboy hat. The police officers are state-certified officers, but funded by the Iowa State Fair Authority. Officers work year-round, providing services to the State Fair and other events held at the Fairgrounds. There are six full-time police officers and a number of part-time officers, made up of both retired and active-duty officers. People arrested at the Fair are booked on site, and transported to Polk County Jail by Des Moines Police Department and the Iowa State Patrol.

Future dates
 2023: August 10–20
 2024: August 8–18
 2025: August 7-17
☆ 2026: August 12-23

References

Further reading
 Rasmussen, Chris. Carnival in the Countryside: The History of the Iowa State Fair (University of Iowa Press, 2015). x, 206 pp
 Rasmussen, Chris. "Progress and Catastrophe: Public History at the Iowa State Fair, 1854-1946." The Annals of Iowa 63 (2004), 357-389.

External links

 Official Site
 Des Moines Register's Iowa State Fair page

 
State fairs
Festivals in Iowa
August events
Culture of Des Moines, Iowa
Tourist attractions in Des Moines, Iowa
Festivals established in 1854
1854 establishments in Iowa